Tintern Grammar (also known as Tintern) is an independent, Anglican day school for girls and boys located in Ringwood East, a suburb of Melbourne, Victoria, Australia.

Established in 1877 by Emma Bartlet Cook, Tintern has a non-selective enrolment policy and currently caters for over 890 students, from ELC through to Year 12, including international students.

Located on one site in Ringwood East, the Early Learning Centre is co-educational, while girls and boys are educated in single-sex environments from Prep – Year 9. In Years 10 – 12 boys and girls learn together in a co-educational classes.

The school is a member of the Eastern Independent Schools of Melbourne (EISM), the Junior School Heads Association of Australia (JSHAA), the Association of Heads of Independent Schools of Australia (AHISA), Alliance of Girls' Schools Australasia (AGSA) and was a founding member of Girls Sport Victoria (GSV).

History
Tintern was founded in 1877 by Emma Cook. Not satisfied with any of the established schools in Hawthorn, Cook felt she needed to start "an excellent school" for her four youngest daughters and
the youngest of her five sons. It was not long before neighbours asked Cook to allow their children to enrol, and as word spread about the achievements of the school, many country families also sent their children to attend.

The Church of England Trust purchased the school in 1918, and what was initially a co-educational school, became a school for girls known as Tintern Church of England Girls’ Grammar School. The site had been purchased in June 1946 for £3,113.

In 1999, under the principalship of Sylvia Walton (1982–2005), the school returned to Cook's founding wish of educating the whole family, with the establishment of Tintern's brother school, Southwood, located at Ringwood.

Campus

Tintern Grammar is set on a  campus in a semi-rural setting, featuring bushland and landscaped gardens. The schools facilities include a multi-function assembly and performance space, ELC, senior and junior libraries and information centres, science and technology laboratories, computer laboratories, established areas for visual and performing arts, a swimming pool and gymnasium complex and other sporting facilities.

The school also features a farm, where students are encouraged to take part in a Young Farmers program, in which they enter in agricultural competitions. The farm has been operational since the opening of the Ringwood campus of the school, and has since been very successful in local sheep competitions.

Curriculum
Up until 2021 Tintern Grammar offered the International Baccalaureate (IB), the Victorian Certificate of Education (VCE) and Vocational Education Training (VET).
However, from 2021 onwards Tintern Grammar only offers the Victorian Certificate of Education (VCE) and Vocational Education Training (VET)

House system 
Tintern has a house system adopted in 1924 and modelled on great English Public Schools. When Tintern Girls and Southwood Boys combined their houses did too. The Tintern Grammar houses are Butterss-Cross (after Agnes Cross, Headmistress 1911–1918), Gordon-Grant (after three former head prefects, all sisters), Mansfield-Mckie (after founder and first principal Emma Cook, whose maiden name was Mansfield), Somner-Stewart  (after three sisters, two of whom were staff members) and Dann-Watt, after ex-student and Olympic Gold medal winning cyclist Kathy Watt.

Sport 
Tintern is a member of the Eastern Independent Schools of Melbourne (EISM).

EISM Premierships 
Tintern has won the following EISM senior premierships.

Combined:

 Swimming (5) – 2004, 2005, 2006, 2007, 2008

Boys:

 Badminton (2) – 2009, 2019
 Hockey – 2009
 Indoor Soccer – 2004
 Swimming (5) – 2004, 2005, 2006, 2007, 2008
 Table Tennis (3) – 2006, 2008, 2017
 Tennis (3) – 2007, 2008, 2009

Girls:

 Athletics – 2006
 Basketball (2) – 2011, 2012
 Hockey (3) – 2010, 2011, 2022
 Indoor Cricket (4) – 2015, 2017, 2018, 2020
 Netball (3) – 2012, 2013, 2017
 Swimming (4) – 2004, 2005, 2007, 2010
 Tennis (4) – 2010, 2011, 2013, 2015
 Volleyball - 2022

Tintern has won the following Year 9 EISM Premierships

Year 9 Boys:
 Badminton (2) - 2018, 2019
 Hockey - 2011
 Table Tennis (4) - 2014, 2018, 2019, 2022
 Tennis (5) - 2012, 2018, 2019, 2020, 2022
 Touch Rugby - 2022
 Volleyball - 2022

Year 9 Girls:
 Badminton (2) - 2017, 2022
 Basketball (2) - 2010, 2011
 Hockey - 2017
 Indoor Cricket - 2013
 Netball - 2010
 Softball (2) - 2014, 2016
 Tennis (7) - 2011, 2012, 2014, 2016, 2020, 2021, 2022
 Volleyball (2) - 2012, 2017

Notable alumni 
Alumnae of Tintern Grammar are known as 'Old Girls' or 'Old Boys' and automatically become members of the schools alumni association, the Tintern Old Girls Association (TOGA) or the Southwood Old Boys Association (SOBA). Some notable past students include:
Charlotte Anderson – first female professor in paediatrics in the United Kingdom
Jo Bailey – Sale of the Century co-presenter
Fifi Box – Radio broadcaster
Kimberley Chen – Taiwanese celebrity, singer and model
Louise Hearman – artist
Scotty James – Olympic snow boarding bronze medallist, 2018 PyeongChang Winter Olympic Games
Thomas Lacey – Actor
Judy Maddigan – Member for the seat of Essendon representing the ALP
Hilary McPhee – Vice-chancellor's fellow University of Melbourne and former publisher
Celia Pacquola – Comedian, actor, writer
Helen Quinn – Australian-American theoretical physicist and educator, an Honorary Officer of the Order of Australia. (Her name was Helen Arnold when she graduated from Tintern Church of England Girls' Grammar School in 1959.)
Helen Reddy – Singer-songwriter and actress
Phyllis Rountree (1911–1994) bacteriologist
Penelope Thwaites – Concert pianist and composer
Ilona von Möller (née von Feuchtersleben) – Violinist
Kathy Watt – Gold medallist cyclist at the 1992 Barcelona Olympics in the Road Race

See also 

 List of schools in Victoria

References

External links 
Tintern Grammar Website

Educational institutions established in 1877
Anglican schools in Melbourne
Junior School Heads Association of Australia Member Schools
International Baccalaureate schools in Australia
1877 establishments in Australia
Grammar schools in Australia
Girls' schools in Victoria (Australia)
Buildings and structures in the City of Maroondah
Ringwood, Victoria